"Driftmark" is the seventh episode of the first season of the HBO fantasy drama television series House of the Dragon. It first aired on October 2, 2022. It was written by Kevin Lau, and directed by Miguel Sapochnik.

The plot follows Laena Velaryon's funeral at Driftmark; Aemond claiming Laena's dragon Vhagar which led to a fight between him and Baela, Rhaena, Jacerys and Lucerys, resulting in Aemond losing his left eye; and continued speculation surrounding Rhaenyra and Laenor's sons as bastards.

It received highly positive reviews from critics, who praised Sapochnik's direction, the opening funeral scene, Aemond claiming Vhagar, the fight between Aemond and other children, the midnight confrontation, the closing plot twist, and performances of the cast, particularly Olivia Cooke's. Nevertheless, some critics took issue with the lighting, dubbing the night scene unduly dark.

Plot
King Viserys and his court attend Lady Laena Velaryon's funeral in Driftmark. While there, Rhaenyra, secretly grieving her paramour Ser Harwin Strong's death, is reunited with her uncle and Laena's widower, Daemon. Daemon and Viserys are also reunited, though Daemon declines to reconcile and return to King's Landing. Larys Strong, the new Lord of Harrenhal, also attends.

During the night, Rhaenyra and Daemon meet on the beach and are physically intimate. Prince Aemond sneaks out and claims Laena's dragon Vhagar as his own, nearly falling off while riding it. Aemond's cousins and nephews angrily confront him, with Laena's daughter Rhaena demanding that Vhagar rightfully should be hers. An altercation results in Lucerys slashing Aemond's left eye with a knife. All the royal children are brought before King Viserys. Queen Alicent wants Lucerys' eye gouged out as retribution. When Viserys refuses, a distraught Alicent grabs Viserys' Valyrian steel dagger and lunges at Lucerys. Rhaenyra blocks her, but Alicent wounds the princess' arm. Viserys considers the matter settled when Aemond says gaining the dragon was a fair exchange for losing an eye. Amid claims that Rhaenyra's children are bastards, Viserys decrees that anyone doubting his grandsons' legitimacy will lose their tongue. Princess Rhaenys privately urges Lord Corlys to pass his title and name through their granddaughter, Baela, knowing their homosexual son Laenor did not father Rhaenyra's children.

Reinstated Hand of the King, Otto Hightower is impressed with Alicent's newly-displayed character strength and says they will soon prevail. Daemon and Rhaenyra agree to unite against Alicent and her supporters. Rhaenyra wants them to marry, which Daemon says is impossible while her husband, Laenor, is alive. Daemon approaches Laenor's lover Ser Qarl Correy with a proposition. Soon after, Qarl apparently murders Laenor during a fight inside High Tide castle. Amid the chaotic aftermath, Rhaenys and Corlys believe the charred body in the grand hall fireplace is Laenor's. Daemon and Rhaenyra expect to be blamed for Laenor's death but know enemies will fear them. The two of them marry in the old Valyrian tradition, their respective children in attendance. Meanwhile, Laenor, having faked his death and shaved his head, secretly flees Driftmark with Qarl.

Production

Writing 
"Driftmark" was written by producer Kevin Lau, marking his first time in the Game of Thrones franchise.

Filming 

The episode was directed by showrunner and executive producer Miguel Sapochnik, making it his third directorial credit for the series, after "The Heirs of the Dragon" and "The Princess and the Queen". It also marks his ninth and last time for the overall franchise, following his departure as showrunner before the production of season two.

St. Michael's Mount island, in Mount's Bay, Cornwall, England served as the location for Driftmark.

Casting 
The episode stars Paddy Considine, Matt Smith, Olivia Cooke, Emma D'Arcy, Rhys Ifans, Steve Toussaint, Eve Best, Fabien Frankel, Graham McTavish, and Matthew Needham. It marks the final appearance of Ty Tennant, Evie Allen, Leo Ashton, Leo Hart, Harvey Sadler, Shani Smethurst, and Eva Ossei-Gerning who portrayed the young versions of Aegon, Helaena, Aemond, Jacaerys, Lucerys, Baela, and Rhaena, respectively, due to the time jump between this and the succeeding episode, in which the adult version of the seven characters is each portrayed by Tom Glynn-Carney, Phia Saban, Ewan Mitchell, Harry Collett, Elliot Grihault, Bethany Antonia, and Phoebe Campbell.

Reception

Ratings
An estimated 1.88 million viewers watched "Driftmark" during its first broadcast on HBO on October 2, 2022.

Critical response
The episode received highly positive reviews. On the review aggregator Rotten Tomatoes, it holds an approval rating of 93% based on 30 reviews, with an average rating of 7.4/10. The website's critical consensus said, " While the copious day for night cinematography will prompt viewers to adjust their brightness settings, 'Driftmark' is an exceedingly satisfying excursion into family spats and taboo reunions."

Writing Den of Geek, Alec Bojalad gave it a rating of 4.5 out of 5 stars, praising the opening funeral scene, set design, sound design, pacing, performances, Djawadi's score, and Sapochnik's direction, and called it a "visually-staggering, well-crafted, and tonally-perfect hour of television." It received 4 out of 5 stars from Michael Deacon of The Telegraph, Hillary Kelly of Vulture, and Jack Shepherd of GamesRadar+. Deacon deemed it "another strong episode, crackling with tension and conflict" and highlighted the fight scene between Aemond and Jacaerys, Lucerys, Baela, and Rhaena, as well as the midnight meeting scene. Kelly singled out the scene of Aemond bonding with Vhagar, the pacing (which is considered an improvement from the previous episode), and also the fight scene (especially the choreography), calling it "a clever mirror of how the adults handle the same accusations and slights." Shepherd wrote in his verdict: "A tense wake leads to a bloody showdown in which children try to murder each other. It's blindingly good television", and praised Cooke's performance. Reviewing for IGN, Helen O'Hara gave it an "amazing" 9 out of 10 score and summarized it in her verdict: "An expert blend of darkness and light – except in the cinematography – this is a drama-packed, satisfyingly character driven triumph. You could cut the tension with a knife – and the odd eye too."

References

External links
 "Driftmark" at HBO
 

2022 American television episodes
House of the Dragon episodes
Television episodes directed by Miguel Sapochnik
Television episodes about funerals